Joseph Kenney was an American football player and coach.  He served as the co-head football coach with Joe Reilly at Boston College in 1908, compiling a record of 2–4–2.  1908 was the first season that Boston College returned to varsity status after the program was dropped in 1902.  Kenney was a 1901 graduate of Boston College.

Head coaching record

References

Year of birth missing
Year of death missing
19th-century players of American football
Boston College Eagles football coaches
Boston College Eagles football players